A music pool or DJ record pool is a regionalized and centralized method of music distribution that allows DJs (disc jockeys) to receive promotional music to play in nightclubs and other events such as weddings, festivals and on the radio. Record labels worldwide send their newest releases to the pool of DJs; in exchange, the pool provides feedback on each release as well as exposure in the clubs and other venues they play in. DJs typically pay a monthly subscription to join the service provided by these record pools. Music pools originated as vinyl record pools in 1974 New York City, evolved into CD distribution networks, and later online music distribution between DJs (digital pools). A music pool may have a "brick and mortar" office or may be entirely virtualized.

History
In the early 1980s, DJing was established as a new art form, creating a platform connecting the listener to the performance. According to David Mancuso, one of the co-founders of the first established record pool, “When the disc jockey got two turntables and was in a club using recorded music, a new menu was started because the dancer was part of the performance. You’d have your live musicians, where you’d have to go someplace and listen to them play. Or your home, where you’d sit on your couch and listen to records. Well, the disc jockeys got in-between this and created something new... Where the dancer became part of the whole setting of the music being played.”

As DJing became more popular, there was a higher demand for records. However, an efficient way for DJs to obtain the newest releases from record labels was not yet established and many DJs did not have enough credibility to obtain them on their own. Record labels had trouble identifying individual DJs and their place of work, so many were turned away. Knowing this, Mancuso set up a meeting for about twenty-five local New York DJs and members of record labels to meet and discuss this recurring issue at Club Hollywood. According to Mancuso, the meeting ended in a “total disaster” and resulted in a screaming match between the disc jockeys and record companies.

Mancuso decided to have a separate meeting with the disc jockeys alone and invited them over to The Loft, where they declared their intent regarding fair music distribution for DJs everywhere.

It was then that the first record pool was started by Mancuso in concert with Steve D'Aquisto and Paul Casella in 1974 in New York City as a grassroots, non-profit effort to design an efficient pipeline for swapping information between the music industry and working DJs. It was to be known as The New York Record Pool, which disbanded a few years after its founding, due to differences regarding the operation of the company.

The record pool received the newest releases directly from the record labels and distributed them to their subscribed members. In exchange, they agreed to provide the labels with feedback for each record.

“The disc jockeys would get the records and they’d fill out a feedback sheet; they would give the personal reaction and the floor reaction. And that information, based on the test pressings, would go back to the record company and they would adjust certain things or whatever,” Mancuso said.

Largely used in the United States, the promotional pool system has never really been established outside of that country. The number of record pools peaked about 150 regional organizations during the 1980s and 1990s, but that number dropped off steadily during the shift from vinyl records to CDs then to digital formats.

The broad term "music pool" eventually arose, reflecting the advancing state of music distribution technology and the shrinking number of vinyl promotional releases, shifts that have caused pools to undergo major transformations in membership and in nature.

There are approximately a dozen remaining music pools in operation as of 2017, which collectively produce a monthly chart of their most popular distributed music (Published in DJ Times Magazine). Almost all remaining music pools now provide product to their members in digital format exclusively.

Record pools continue on today as a modern promotional channel used by the biggest record labels around the world to target the vast amount of DJs worldwide. They also act as a tool for individual DJs to release their own productions to the record pool, assisting their careers and helping them gain exposure to the general public.

They have also evolved into a business that has their own team of in-house producers, remixers, and editors that release music into the DJ community through the record pool’s networks.

Many have also adapted to the modern/digital age and post regular content providing the DJ community with DJ related news and advice on how to begin a DJ career.

References

DJing